Frank Augustus Allen (January 29, 1835 – May 22, 1916) was a Massachusetts politician who served as the Mayor of Cambridge, Massachusetts.

Personal life 
Frank was born in Sanford, Maine. His father died when he was two years old. He worked in various businesses, but retired after fourteen years. In 1867, he and others formed the Oriental Tea Company in Boston. He and his family moved to Cambridge in 1870, where he was elected Mayor in December of 1876. He died in Cambridge in 1916.

Notes

1835 births
1916 deaths
Mayors of Cambridge, Massachusetts
People from Sanford, Maine
Cambridge, Massachusetts City Council members
19th-century American politicians